Robert Dennison may refer to:

Robert Dennison (United States Navy officer) (1901–1980), American naval officer and aide to President Harry Truman
Robert Dennison (politician) (1879–1951), British Member of Parliament for Birmingham King's Norton, 1924–1929
Robert Denniston (1800–1867), NY State Comptroller, 1860–1861, sometimes quoted as Robert Dennison
Robbie Dennison (born 1963), Northern Ireland international footballer
Bob Dennison (footballer, born 1900) (1900–1973), English football forward of the 1920s
Bob Dennison (footballer, born 1912) (1912–1996), English football centre half of the 1930s and manager of clubs including Middlesbrough
Bob Dennison (footballer, born 1932) (1932–2017), English football full back of the 1950s